The Sherborne bone is a bone, a fragment of animal rib, with a horse's head engraved on it, once dated to the Palaeolithic period, but now generally viewed as a forgery as radiocarbon dating revealed it to be only about 700 years old. The bone was found in the rubble of a quarry near Sherborne in Dorset.

In October 1911, Philip Grove and Arnaldo Cortesi, two boys at Sherborne School, presented a bone to their science master, Eliot Steele. Steel sent the bone to Arthur Smith Woodward at the National History Museum, who published it as 'an apparent Palaeolithic engraving' of an ancient wild horse (equus przewalski). This identification was soon challenged by William Sollas, who described the bone as 'a forgery perpetrated by some school boys.' However, Arnaldo Cortesi, by then a journalist with the New York Times, denied it was a forgery; and the family of Philip Grove, who had been killed during the First World War, reported that he had always maintained that the find was genuine.

In 1957 Kenneth Oakley performed a fluorine test on the bone, which dated it to the Upper Palaeolithic. In 1980, Ann Sieveking, after studying cracks in the bone, concluded that the engraving had been done after the cracks had been produced, and suggested that the Sherborne bone was 'not an authentic Palaeolithic engraving.' 

In 1994, C.B. Stringer and others carried out a radiocarbon dating, which placed the bone in the 14th century AD; they concluded: 'it now seems inescapable that the Sherborne engraving is a recent fake.' This finding was accepted by J.H.P. Gibb, a housemaster at Sherborne School, and was soon publicized in the national press.

References

Bones
Archaeological forgeries